This is a list of National Parks of East Timor. The national parks of East Timor are run by the Department of Protected Areas and National Parks. The first park, Nino Konis Santana National Park, was established in 2007.

National Parks 

East Timor
National parks